Vitry-le-François is a commune in the Marne department in northeastern France. It is located on the river Marne and is the western terminus of the Marne–Rhine Canal. Vitry-le-François station has rail connections to Paris, Reims, Strasbourg, Metz, Dijon and several regional destinations.

History 
The present town is a relatively recent construction, having been built in 1545 at the behest of King Francis who wished to replace, on a new site, Vitry-en-Perthois, which in 1544 had been entirely destroyed as part of the backwash from the king's Italian War of 1542–46.   The new Vitry was to be a modern city, constructed according to a plan produced by Girolamo Marini.   The king's role in its creation resulted in Vitry-le-François receiving the king's name as part of its own name.

At the beginning of World War I in August 1914, Joseph Joffre established the Grand Quartier Général at the Place Royer-Collard.

Demography

Features
 Its church of Notre-Dame is a 17th-century building with fine 18th-century monuments.
 A convent of the Récollets was later converted to contain the town hall, the court-house, a library and a small museum.
 There is a bronze statue of Pierre Paul Royer-Collard (1763–1845), the politician and philosopher, a native of the district.

Twin towns
Vitry-le-François is twinned with:

  Tauberbischofsheim, Germany, since 1961

Personalities 
 Guy Georges, serial killer
 Étienne-Gabriel Morelly, proto-communist philosopher
 René Herbin (1911–1953), classical pianist
 Simhah ben Samuel of Vitry (fl. c. 1100), Talmudist
 Abraham de Moivre, mathematician

See also
Communes of the Marne department
Champagne Riots
French wine
1961 Vitry-Le-François train bombing

References

Communes of Marne (department)
Subprefectures in France
Champagne (province)
Marne communes articles needing translation from French Wikipedia